Antoniów may refer to the following places in Poland:
Antoniów, Lower Silesian Voivodeship (south-west Poland)
Antoniów, Gmina Opoczno in Łódź Voivodeship (central Poland)
Antoniów, Gmina Żarnów in Łódź Voivodeship (central Poland)
Antoniów, Radomsko County in Łódź Voivodeship (central Poland)
Antoniów, Lublin Voivodeship (east Poland)
Antoniów, Świętokrzyskie Voivodeship (south-central Poland)
Antoniów, Subcarpathian Voivodeship (south-east Poland)
Antoniów, Lipsko County in Masovian Voivodeship (east-central Poland)
Antoniów, Przysucha County in Masovian Voivodeship (east-central Poland)
Antoniów, Radom County in Masovian Voivodeship (east-central Poland)
Antoniów, Szydłowiec County in Masovian Voivodeship (east-central Poland)
Antoniów, Silesian Voivodeship (south Poland)
Antoniów, Opole Voivodeship (south-west Poland)